La teacher de inglés was a Colombian soap opera produced in 2011 for Caracol Television.   It was at first broadcast at 8 pm, was off air for a week when the soap opera La Reina del Sur (The Queen of the South) was shown, returned May 23–27 until its final episode, and then was replaced by the soap opera La Bruja (The Witch).   It starred the Miss Universe runner-up Carolina Gomez and Victor Mallarino, alongside the opposing actors Juan Alfonso Baptista, Isabel Cristina Estrada, Lully Bussa and Samara de Cordova.

Plot
Jesús Kike Peinado (Víctor Mallarino) is the owner of a lingerie manufacturing company, which he founded with his ex wife Mercedes (Lully Bossa), who left him after getting involved with a rich American citizen. Kike starts doing business with American clients, but since he does not speak English, he asks his cousin Luis Fernando (Juan Alfonso Baptista) for help. Luis Fernando, who is involved with drug dealers, is joined by his assistant and lover Milena (Isabel Estrada), both wishing to take advantage of Kike's company. Despite his cousin's help, Kike decides to learn English on his own and meets Pili (Carolina Gómez), a middle-class young woman and a professional English teacher unable to travel to the US after having her visa denied. Kike slowly falls in love with Pili and hires her in order to give private English classes for him and his employees.

Cast
Victor Mallarino as Jesús Antonio "Kike" Peinado
Carolina Gómez as Pilar "Pili" Ortega
Carolina López as Catalina "Cata" Ortega
Juan Alfonso Baptista as Luis Fernando Caicedo
Isabel Cristina Estrada as Milena Ramírez
Dora Cadavid as Rita
Lully Bossa as Mercedes
Kenny Delgado as José Acosta
Samara de Córdova as Eloísa
Ilja Rosendahl as Immigration Officer
Jenny Marie Marrero as American confused hotel receptionist

References

External links
 Official site (in Spanish)
 Parody (in Spanish and English)

2011 telenovelas
2011 Colombian television series debuts
2011 Colombian television series endings
Colombian telenovelas
Caracol Televisión telenovelas
Spanish-language telenovelas
Television shows set in Bogotá